Mount Bethel Methodist Church is a historic church in the Port Murray section of Mansfield Township, Warren County, New Jersey, United States.

It was built in 1844 in Vernacular Greek Revival style. It was added to the National Register of Historic Places in 1980.

See also
 National Register of Historic Places listings in Warren County, New Jersey

References

Mansfield Township, Warren County, New Jersey
Methodist churches in New Jersey
Churches on the National Register of Historic Places in New Jersey
Churches completed in 1844
19th-century Methodist church buildings in the United States
Churches in Warren County, New Jersey
National Register of Historic Places in Warren County, New Jersey
New Jersey Register of Historic Places